Evgeny Vladimirovich Shalunov (born 8 January 1992) is a Russian professional road and track bicycle racer, who currently rides for UCI ProTeam .

Career

A winner of eight national events in 2011 with Lokomotiv–Urbycolan, Shalunov signed with the  team for the 2012 season. After finishing fourth in the La Roue Tourangelle held in France in March, Shalunov won his first UCI Europe Tour race in April 2012, by winning the Vuelta a La Rioja in Spain.

He was named in the start list for the 2017 Giro d'Italia.

Major results

2010
 1st Overall Závod Míru
1st Stages 2 & 4
 2nd  Individual pursuit, UEC European Junior Track Championships
 2nd Overall Vuelta al Besaya
1st Stage 4
2011
 1st Overall Bidasoa Itzulia
1st Stages 1 & 3
 1st GP Macario
 1st Memorial Valenciaga
 Volta a Coruña
1st Stages 1 & 3
 1st Stage 3 Ronde de l'Isard
2012
 1st Vuelta a La Rioja
 4th La Roue Tourangelle
2013
 7th Overall Vuelta a Castilla y León
 7th Gran Premio San Giuseppe
 10th Klasika Primavera
2014
 1st Gran Premio della Liberazione
 4th Ster ZLM Toer
 7th Vuelta a La Rioja
2015
 1st  Overall Vuelta a la Comunidad de Madrid
1st  Points classification
1st Stage 1
 1st Trofeo Matteotti
 2nd Klasika Primavera
 6th Overall Vuelta a Asturias
2016
 5th Overall Tour de Wallonie
 7th Trofeo Matteotti
2017
 5th Rund um Köln
2019
 2nd Overall Vuelta a Aragón
 7th Overall Settimana Internazionale di Coppi e Bartali
 7th GP Industria & Artigianato di Larciano
2020
 6th Trofeo Laigueglia

Grand Tour general classification results timeline

References

External links

Cycling Quotient profile

Russian male cyclists
1992 births
Living people
Cyclists from Saint Petersburg
European Games competitors for Russia
Cyclists at the 2019 European Games
21st-century Russian people